Copper Mines of Tasmania is the successor company to the Mount Lyell Mining and Railway Company that operated in Queenstown, Tasmania for just short of one hundred years.

History 
The first form of the company existed during the time of the Mount Lyell Remediation and Research and Demonstration Program. Following the first form going into administration in 1998 the mine was then acquired in 1999 by Monte Cello BV. First it operated as a subsidiary and then acquired by Sterlite Industries (India) Limited. It is now owned by Vedanta Resources.

Its mine output goes to supply the companies copper smelter in Tuticorin, India.

Production stopped at the mine in January 2014 following three deaths. Its reopening was subsequently prevented by a rockfall. As of July 2014, it was not expected to reopen for up to three years.

See also
West Coast Tasmania Mines

References

External links
 https://web.archive.org/web/20080719025839/http://cmt.com.au/history.asp Copper Mines of Tasmania history

Non-renewable resource companies established in 1999
Companies based in Tasmania
Copper mining companies of Australia
Western Tasmania
Australian companies established in 1999
Vedanta Resources